Unics or UnICS may refer to:
 Unix, originally Unics, computer operating system software
 BC UNICS, a Russian basketball club